Katka's Reinette Apples is a 1926 Soviet silent drama film directed by Fridrikh Ermler and Eduard Ioganson.

The film's art direction was by Yevgeni Yenej.

Plot 
The film is set in Soviet Russia during the mid-1920s. The family of a young peasant woman Katya (Veronica Buzhinskaya) is left without a single food source when their cow dies. To save money for a new Jersey, Katya leaves her native village to work in Leningrad. Once she is in the big city, she falls in with a bad crowd by associating with the thief Syomka Zhgut (Valery Solovtsov). The girl starts to sell Reinette apples to earn money for a living and for the aforementioned new cow. Soon after meeting Syomka, Katya becomes pregnant and gives birth to his child. Once on the street, Katya meets a downtrodden homeless intellectual Vadka Zavrazhina (Fedor Nikitin), nicknamed "Tiligent". Taking pity on him, she invites him to her place.

Cast 
 Veronika Buzhinskaya as Katka  
 Bella Chernova as Verka  
 Yakov Gudkin as Semka's companion  
 Fyodor Nikitin as Vadka Zavrazhin or "Tiligent"  
 Tatyana Okova
 Valeri Plotnikov 
 Valeri Solovtsov as Syomka Zhgut
 Eduard Ioganson as Drunk in the restaurant

Interesting Facts 
One of the directors of the film, Edward Johanson in a cameo plays a man who tries to get a goat tied to the table to drink.
In the original version of the script Katka and Syomka's baby dies.

References

Bibliography 
 Christie, Ian & Taylor, Richard. The Film Factory: Russian and Soviet Cinema in Documents 1896-1939. Routledge, 2012.

External links 
 

Soviet silent feature films
Soviet drama films
1920s Russian-language films
Films directed by Fridrikh Ermler
Soviet black-and-white films
1926 drama films
Silent drama films